The 1998 Lehigh Mountain Hawks football team was an American football team that represented Lehigh University during the 1998 NCAA Division I-AA football season. Lehigh won its third Patriot League championship of the 1990s. 

In their fifth year under head coach Kevin Higgins, the Mountain Hawks went undefeated (11–0) in the regular season, ending the year at 12–1 after losing in the second round of the national playoffs. Deron Braswell, Nick Martucci, Jonathan Stiegler and Sam Brinley were the team captains.

Including playoff games, the Mountain Hawks outscored opponents 396 to 189. Their 6–0 conference record topped the seven-team Patriot League standings. 

Unranked at the start of the year, Lehigh's winning streak finally earned a spot in the national Division I-AA top 25 in the last week of October. In the ensuing weeks, the Hawks rose from No. 25 to reach No. 7 in the final poll.

Despite their conference championship and undefeated record, Lehigh did not host any playoff games. The Mountain Hawks defeated No. 10 Richmond and then lost to No. 1 UMass on the road.

Lehigh played its home games at Goodman Stadium on the university's Goodman Campus in Bethlehem, Pennsylvania.

Schedule

References

Lehigh
Lehigh Mountain Hawks football seasons
Patriot League football champion seasons
Lehigh Mountain Hawks football